The 1993 All-Ireland Senior Football Championship was the 107th staging of the All-Ireland Senior Football Championship, the Gaelic Athletic Association's premier inter-county Gaelic football tournament. The championship began on 16 May 1993 and ended on 19 September 1993.

Donegal entered the championship as the defending champions; however, they were defeated by Derry in the Ulster final played during a deluge in Clones.

Derry went on to win the Sam Maguire Cup for the first time, beating Dublin in the All-Ireland semi-final and then Cork in the All-Ireland final by 1-14 to 2-8. Seamas Downey scored Derry's only goal, with his Lavey club mate, John McGurk, being named RTÉ man of the match.

Provincial championships

Munster Senior Football Championship

Quarter-finals

Semi-finals

Final

Leinster Senior Football Championship

Preliminary round

Quarter-finals

Semi-finals

Final

Ulster Senior Football Championship

Preliminary round

Quarter-finals

Semi-finals

Final

Connacht Senior Football Championship

Quarter-finals

Semi-finals

Final

All-Ireland Senior Football Championship

Semi-finals

Final

Championship statistics

Scoring

Overall

Miscellaneous

 On 30 May 1993, in Tuam Stadium, Tuam, Leitrim recorded their first win over Galway since 1949.
 On 20 June 1993, the Munster semi-final game between Tipperary vs Waterford was the first game to be played at Walsh Park, Waterford for 36 years.
 Tipperary reached their first Munster final since 1944 and was first without Kerry since 1957.
 The All Ireland between Dublin and Derry was Derry's first championship wins over Dublin after Dublin having win in the 1958 All Ireland final and 1975 All Ireland semi-final.
 The All-Ireland final between Cork and Derry was a unique occasion as it was the first ever championship meeting between the two teams. Derry, who were appearing in only their second All-Ireland final and their first since 1958, won the championship for the first and only time in their history. Prime Minister of Australia Paul Keating was a guest of Taoiseach Albert Reynolds at the match. A crowd control gate at the Canal End had to be opened during the match to allow 120 people, mainly women and children, onto the sideline. It was the last All-Ireland final to be played before the complete renovation of Croke Park.

References

External links
 "'Like something out of Hollywood'". 23 May 2020.